This is a list of episodes of the Chinese variety show Running Man China special episodes. The show airs on ZRTG: Zhejiang Television.

Episodes

Special Episodes

Notes

References

Running Man China